The 1928 United States presidential election in Kentucky took place on November 6, 1928 as part of the 1928 United States presidential election. Voters chose 13 representatives, or electors to the Electoral College, who voted for president and vice president.

Background and vote
Ever since the Civil War, Kentucky had been shaped politically by divisions created by that war between secessionist, Democratic counties and Unionist, Republican ones, although the state as a whole leaned Democratic throughout this era and the GOP carried the state only in 1896 and 1924.

In 1928, as in all of the upland South, Kentucky's extremely stable Civil War partisan political pattern would become significantly disturbed due to the nomination, after all other prominent Democrats sat the election out due to the prevailing prosperity, of urban, anti-Prohibition Catholic Al Smith. Once Smith was nominated – despite his attempt to dispel fears by nominating "dry" Southern Democrat Joseph T. Robinson as his running mate – extreme fear ensued in the South, which had no experience of the Southern and Eastern European Catholic immigrants who were Smith's local constituency. Southern fundamentalist Protestants believed that Smith would allow papal and priestly leadership in the United States, which Protestantism was a reaction against. In the east of the state where many communities were becoming sundown towns or counties it was believed that Smith was unacceptable also because the Catholic Church officially opposed social and political segregation of the races.

As with the former Confederate states, opposition to Smith in Kentucky was organised by the Protestant churches, led by James Cannon Jr. and Arthur J. Barton. A major state paper, The Western Recorder had been heavily opposing Smith for over a year before the campaign began. When the campaign did begin, Smith's religion was the overwhelming concern, and at the beginning of October it appeared as though Republican nominee Herbert Hoover was likely to carry the state. Although later in October there were thoughts Smith would challenge the GOP nominee, in the end Hoover won the state by a margin of 18.88 percent against Al Smith gaining all thirteen of the state's electors as a result. Traditional Democratic loyalties were maintained best in the Jackson Purchase, where racial issues were of greatest importance and there was opposition from memories of the 1927 Mississippi flood to Hoover's record on flood relief.

Hoover became the first Republican nominee to exceed his national vote share in the Bluegrass State, with Kentucky voting 1.40 points more Republican than the nation at-large. He was the solitary Republican presidential candidate to carry Menifee County until George W. Bush in 2000, and also the first ever Republican victor in the following counties: Anderson, Barren, Boone, Bullitt, Daviess, Grant, Hardin, LaRue, Livingston, Mason, McCracken, McLean, Montgomery, Nicholas, Oldham, Powell, Robertson, Scott, Shelby and Spencer. 

This was the last time Kentucky voted Republican until Dwight Eisenhower won the state in his re-election bid in 1956.

Results

Results by county

References 

Kentucky
1928 Kentucky elections
United States presidential elections in Kentucky